François Mackandal (c.1730-c.1758) was a Haitian Maroon leader in the French colony of Saint-Domingue (present-day Haiti). He is sometimes described as a Haitian vodou priest, or houngan. For joining Maroons to kill slave owners in Saint-Domingue, he was captured and burned alive by French colonial authorities.  

Haitian historian Thomas Madiou states that Mackandal "had instruction and possessed the Arabic language very well."
Early sources identify him as coming from Mount Atlas which spans the Magreb, but contemporary scholars such as Sylviane Diouf have speculated that he may have been from the modern day nations of Senegal, Mali, or Guinea.  During his interrogation he allegedly repeated the Shahada (testimony of Muslim faith) in Arabic several times and even translated its meaning to his French captors during his interrogation before being condemned to death.

His significance as a leader in the fight for Haitian independence has been immortalized through Haitian currency.

The association of Mackandal with "black magic" seems to be a result of his use of poison, derived from natural plants:
The enslaved Mackandal, a houngan knowledgeable of poisons, organized a widespread plot to poison the masters, their water supplies and animals. The movement spread great terror among the slave owners and killed hundreds before the secret of Mackandal was tortured from a slave.

Biography
Mackandal created poisons from island herbs. He distributed the poison to slaves, who added it to the meals and refreshments they served the French plantation owners and planters. He became a charismatic guerrilla leader who united the different Maroon bands and created a network of secret organizations connected with slaves still on plantations. According to C.L.R. James, Mackandal had eloquence to a European orator, differing only in strength and vigor. He led Maroons to raid plantations at night, torch property and kill the owners.

In 1758, the French, fearing that Mackandal would drive all whites from the colony, tortured an ally of Mackandal into divulging information that led to Makandal's capture. After six years of planning and building up an organization of black slaves throughout Haiti to poison the French, he was burned at the stake in the center square of Port-au-Prince in front of everyone. However, people from the crowd, particularly the black slaves, believed that Mackandal rose out of the flames and transformed into a winged beast that flew to safety.

Beyond the sketch of historical events outlined above, there is a colorful and varied range of myths about Mackandal. Various supernatural accounts of his execution, and of his escaping capture by the French authorities, are preserved in island folklore and widely depicted in paintings and popular art.

It is speculated that Mackandal lost his right arm in a farming accident when it was caught in a sugarcane press and crushed between the rollers.

In popular culture 
One of the most well-known portraits of Mackandal is that in Alejo Carpentier's magical realist novel, The Kingdom of this World.

Mackandal's public torture and execution (via burning at the stake) is depicted vividly in Guy Endore's 1934 novel Babouk.  Both Mackandal's rebel conspiracy and his brutal killing are shown as influential on Babouk (based on Boukman), who helps to lead a 1791 slave revolt.

A fictionalized version of Mackandal also appears in Nalo Hopkinson's novel, The Salt Roads and in Mikelson Toussaint-Fils's novel, Bloody trails: the Messiah of the islands (in French, Les sentiers rouges: Le Messie des iles).

In Neil Gaiman's novel American Gods, a boy named Agasu is enslaved in Africa and brought to Haiti, where he eventually loses his arm and leads a rebellion against the European establishment. This account is very similar to that of Mackandal's.

C G S Millworth's novel, Makandal's Legacy tells of Makandal's fictional son, Jericho, and the gift of immortality he received as a result of his father's pact with the voodoo spirits, the lwa.

The Harvard ethnobotanist and Anthropologist, Wade Davis, writes about Francois Macandal in his novel "The Serpent and the Rainbow." In the chapter "Tell my Horse" Davis explores the historical beginnings of vodoun culture and speculates Mackandal as a chief propagator of the Vodoun religion.

In the video game Assassin's Creed III: Liberation, the character Agaté mentions François Mackandal as having been his Assassin mentor, and also recalls how Mackandal was burned at the stake following his failed attempt to poison the colonists of Saint-Domingue. The game portrays a false Mackandal who is actually another character called Baptiste, who according to Agaté was once a brother and has also been trained by the real Mackandal, but betrayed the Assassins following his death. The character uses a Skull face painting and is missing his left arm, which he amputated to impersonate his mentor, although the real Mackandal lost his right arm. Mackandal is also mentioned several times in the prequel game Assassin's Creed Rogue as the mentor of the Saint-Domingue Brotherhood of Assassins, who maintains close relations with the North American Colonial Brotherhood.

See also
Haitian Revolution

Further reading 
“Prophetic Religion, Violence, and Black Freedom: Reading Makandal’s Project of Black Liberation through A Fanonian postcolonial lens of decolonization and theory of revolutionary humanism” by Celucien L. Joseph, Black Theology: An International Journal (2012): 9:3

Footnotes

External links
 The Louverture Project: 
 Haiti 1804-2007

Year of birth unknown
1758 deaths
Haitian Vodou practitioners
Haitian rebel slaves
Executed Haitian people
18th-century executions by France
People from Cap-Haïtien
People of Saint-Domingue
People executed by France by burning
Maroons (people)
Haitian independence activists
18th-century slaves
18th-century rebels